Winston Smith (born 22 November 1982) is a Jamaican track and field sprinter who competed in the men's 4×100 metres relay at the 2004 Summer Olympics in Athens. He was the heat runner for the Jamaican men's relay team at the 2006 Commonwealth Games, where the team won gold in the final.

References

Sports Reference

Living people
1982 births
Jamaican male sprinters
Olympic athletes of Jamaica
Athletes (track and field) at the 2004 Summer Olympics
Commonwealth Games gold medallists for Jamaica
Athletes (track and field) at the 2006 Commonwealth Games
Commonwealth Games medallists in athletics
Medallists at the 2006 Commonwealth Games